Hervé du Monceau de Bergendael (13 April 1910 – 20 January 1977) was a Belgian fencer. He competed in the individual and team épée events at the 1936 Summer Olympics.

References

External links
 

1910 births
1977 deaths
Belgian male fencers
Olympic fencers of Belgium
Fencers at the 1936 Summer Olympics
People from Izegem
Sportspeople from West Flanders